Sir Richard Thomas Gilpin, 1st Baronet (12 January 1801 – 8 April 1882) was an English Conservative politician who sat in the House of Commons from 1851 to 1880.

Gilpin was the only son of Richard Gilpin of Hockliffe, who was Lieutenant-Colonel of 
the Bedfordshire Militia, and his second wife, Sarah Wilkinson, fourth daughter of William Wilkinson of Westmorland. He was educated at Rugby School and at Christ's College, Cambridge and served in the 14th Light Dragoons, and in the Rifle Brigade reaching the rank of Lieutenant-Colonel. He was Colonel of the Bedfordshire Militia. He was Deputy Lieutenant and J.P. for Bedfordshire and Buckinghamshire and High Sheriff of Bedfordshire in 1850.

In 1851 Gilpin was elected Member of Parliament for Bedfordshire. He held the seat until 1880. He was in favour of civil and religious liberty.  He was created baronet 'of Hockliffe Grange, in the County of Bedford' on 19 February 1876.

Gilpin died at the age of 81.

In 1831, Gilpin married Mrs Louisa Turton, née Browne (d. 1871), former wife of Mr Thomas Turton (later Sir Thomas Edward Mitchell Turton) whom she divorced for adultery in 1831 in a famous case Turton vs Turton 1829–1831.  Louisa was eldest daughter of General Gore Browne of Weymouth; her first marriage in 1812 to Thomas Turton, son of a baronet, was dissolved by the House of Lords decision 1831 permitting Louisa to divorce her husband.  Louisa Turton was only the second woman so permitted (after Mrs Addison in 1801), and the decision also allowed her to remarry.

References

External links

1801 births
1882 deaths
Baronets in the Baronetage of the United Kingdom
People educated at Rugby School
Alumni of Christ's College, Cambridge
High Sheriffs of Bedfordshire
UK MPs 1847–1852
UK MPs 1852–1857
UK MPs 1857–1859
UK MPs 1859–1865
UK MPs 1865–1868
UK MPs 1868–1874
UK MPs 1874–1880
Conservative Party (UK) MPs for English constituencies